Thermosinus carboxydivorans is an anaerobic, thermophilic, Gram-negative, carbon-monoxide-oxidizing, hydrogenogenic bacterium, the type species of its genus. It is facultatively carboxydotrophic, curved, motile, rod-shaped, with a length of 2.6–3 μm, a width of about 0.5 μm and lateral flagellation. Its type strain is Nor1T (=DSM 14886T =VKM B-2281T).

References

Further reading

Robb, Frank T., et al. "Primary energy metabolism in geothermal environments: the role of carbon monoxide." Geothermal Biology and Geochemistry in Yellowstone National Park (2005): 163–170.

External links

LPSN
Type strain of Thermosinus carboxydivorans at BacDive -  the Bacterial Diversity Metadatabase

Eubacteriales
Thermophiles
Bacteria described in 2004